A by-election was held in the Cook Islands electorate of Murienua on 19 September 2013. The by-election was precipitated by the resignation of sitting MP Tom Marsters following his appointment as Queen's Representative.

Planning for the by-election began immediately following the announcement of Marsters' appointment. Initially the by-election was expected to happen in August, but it was later delayed until September.

The election was contested by two candidates: the Cook Islands Party's Kaota Tuariki and the Democratic Party's James Beer. It was won by Tuariki.

Aftermath
Allegations of electoral fraud, including late campaigning and treating, were raised shortly after the by-election. On 1 October the Democratic party lodged an election petition. A formal hearing of the petition was pre-empted by Tuariki's resignation, precipitating the 2014 Murienua by-election.

Following his resignation, the Democratic party lodged a complaint of bribery and treating against Tuariki with police.

References

By-elections in the Cook Islands
2013 elections in Oceania
2013 in the Cook Islands